Events from the year 1596 in art.

Events
 (unknown)

Paintings

Federico Barocci - Annunciation (Basilica of Santa Maria degli Angeli, Assisi)
Caravaggio
The Lute Player
Medusa (first version)
Annibale Carracci - The Choice of Hercules

Births

January 13 - Jan van Goyen, Dutch landscape painter (died 1656)
February 2 - Jacob van Campen, Dutch artist and architect of the Golden Age (died 1657)
April - Juan van der Hamen, Spanish still life painter (died 1631)
May - Abraham van Diepenbeeck, Dutch painter of the Flemish School (died 1675)
June 5 - Peter Wtewael, Dutch painter, son of Joachim Wtewael (died 1660)
October 1 - Cesare Dandini, Italian painter (died 1657)
October 5 - Pieter van Mierevelt, Dutch Golden Age painter (died 1623)
November 1 – Pietro da Cortona, pseudonym of Pietro Berettini,  prolific artist and architect of High Baroque (died 1669)
December 24 - Leonaert Bramer, Dutch painter (died 1674)
date unknown
Antonio Bisquert, Spanish painter of the Baroque period (died 1646)
Obaku Dokuryu, Japanese calligrapher and painter (died 1672)
Andrea di Leone, Italian painter of battle scenes (died 1675)
Xiao Yuncong, Chinese landscape painter, calligrapher, and poet in the late Ming Dynasty (died 1673)
probable
Thomas de Keyser, Dutch painter and architect (died 1667)
Antonio Catalani, Italian painter of the late-Renaissance and early-Baroque periods (d. unknown)

Deaths
July 10 - Alessandro Alberti, Italian painter (born 1551) 
date unknown
Hans Donauer, German painter (b. c.1521)
George Gower, English portrait painter who became sergeant-painter to Queen Elizabeth I (born 1540)
Nicholas Francken of Herenthals, Flemish painter (b. unknown)
Dario Varotari the Elder, Italian painter, sculptor, and architect (b. c.1539)
Pedro de Villegas Marmolejo, Spanish sculptor and painter (born 1519)
probable
Niccolò Circignani, Italian painter of the late-Renaissance or Mannerist period (born 1517/1524)
Pellegrino Tibaldi, Italian mannerist architect, sculptor, and mural painter (born 1527)

 
Years of the 16th century in art